Ross Campbell may refer to:

 Ross Campbell (composer), Scottish composer
 Ross Campbell (diplomat) (1918–2007), Canadian diplomat
 Ross Campbell (footballer) (born 1987), Scottish professional football player
 Sophie Campbell, comics creator formerly known as Ross Campbell